László Szabó (born 24 March 1936) is a Hungarian actor, film director and screenwriter. Since 1952, he has appeared in more than 120 films.  These include seven films that have been screened at the Cannes Film Festival.

Selected filmography

 La Poupée (1962)
 Pierrot le Fou (1965)
 Made in USA (1966)
 The Confession (1970)
 Adoption (1975)
 The Song of Roland (1978)
 Just Like Home (1978)
 Judith Therpauve (1978)
 A Nice Neighbor (1979)
 The Last Metro (1980)
 Temporary Paradise (1981)
 Passion (1982)
 Dögkeselyű (1982)
 Les nuits de la pleine lune (1984)
 Accroche-coeur (1987)
 The Sentinel (1992)
 Les Enfants jouent à la Russie (1993)
 Cold Water (1994)
 Up, Down, Fragile (1995)
 Place Vendôme (1998)
 Esther Kahn (2000)
 Playing 'In the Company of Men' (2003)
 Parc (2008)

References

External links

1936 births
Living people
Hungarian male film actors
Hungarian film directors
Hungarian screenwriters
Male screenwriters
Hungarian male writers
Writers from Budapest
Male actors from Budapest